Greg Worthington (born 17 July 1990) is a professional rugby league footballer who plays as a  for Barrow Raiders in the Betfred Championship.

He previously played for the Leigh Centurions in the Championship.

Background
Worthington was born in Queensbury, West Yorkshire, England.

He is married with two children.

Club career

Huddersfield Giants
Worthington began his career at Queensbury ARLFC before joining Huddersfield, where he played in the academy team.

Featherstone Rovers
He left Huddersfield without making a first team appearance and joined Featherstone in the Championship.

Leigh Centurions
After four years with Featherstone he joined Leigh, where he won the Championship title in 2015 and 2016 and helped the club gain promotion to Super League in the 2016 Super 8s.

Toronto Wolfpack
On September 30, 2016, it was announced that he would be joining Toronto Wolfpack for the club's inaugural season in 2017.

Halifax Panthers
On 24 August 2020, it was reported that Worthington would join Halifax for the 2021 season

Barrow Raiders
On 6 October 2022, it was announced that he would join Barrow Raiders.

References

External links
Toronto Wolfpack profile
Profile at featherstonerovers.net

1990 births
Living people
Barrow Raiders players
English rugby league players
Featherstone Rovers players
Halifax R.L.F.C. players
Leigh Leopards players
Rugby league players from Bradford
Rugby league utility players
Toronto Wolfpack players